Annella mollis (Subergorgia mollis) is a species of soft corals belonging to the family Subergorgiidae. They live in areas in the Indo-West Pacific, around 12 to 18 meters deep, in lower reef slopes, on rocks and sand substrates.

References

External links
 

Subergorgiidae
Animals described in 1910